All Alone (NURP.39.SDS.39) was a war pigeon who was decorated for bravery in service during the Second World War for delivering an important secret message in one day over a distance of , while serving with the National Pigeon Service in August, 1943.

Mission
In the summer of 1943, All Alone, a blue hen, parachuted with a spy into Vienne, France.  The agent learned important information about the Milice, a secret paramilitary group that was to conduct assassinations, round up Jews for deportation, and to attack the French Resistance.  All Alone carried this information more than four hundred miles, across the English Channel, back to her home in Staines, England, in less than twenty-four hours.  The speed of her flight and the urgency of its success earned All Alone a Dickin Medal, an award known as the animal equivalent of the Victoria Cross, "...for Gallantry and Devotion to Duty" in 1946.

See also
 List of individual birds

References

External links
 A photo of All Alone with admirers
 PDSA Dickin Medal

Recipients of the Dickin Medal
Individual domesticated pigeons